Ilisavani Jegesa is a Fijian rugby league international footballer who plays as a centre for Nabua Broncos and Kaiviti Silktails. He stays with his family in Nabua. He dropped out from school when he was in class six. "Joining the Fiji Bati to the world cup is really an honour," he said. He also represents Nabua in 7's and XV.

Playing career
Born in Rakiraki, a district in the Kadavu Province of Fiji, Jegesa started his career as a rugby union player. He later switched to rugby league, playing for the City Storm before moving to Nabua Broncos.

Representative career
He was named in the Fiji squad for the 2013 Rugby League World Cup.

Personal life
Jegesa is the cousin of Nemani Suguturaga, who was selected in Fiji's squad for the 2008 Rugby League World Cup.

References

1988 births
Fijian rugby league players
Fiji national rugby league team players
Kaiviti Silktails players
Rugby league centres
Living people
People from Kadavu Province
I-Taukei Fijian people